Dr. G. Prabha is a retired professor of Sanskrit, writer, film-maker and former journalist based in Chennai, Tamil Nadu, India.

Life and career
He started his career as a journalist but soon switched to teaching. He worked in Government Sanskrit College, Tripunithura (Kerala), St. Joseph's College, Tiruchi (Tamil Nadu) and Loyola College, Chennai, from where he retired in 2014 as Professor of Sanskrit and Head of the Department of Oriental Languages.

Prabha wrote and directed 'Ishti', the first film in Sanskrit with a social theme. It won critical acclaim at several film festivals. He has also filmed two documentaries 'Agnaye' and 'Akkitham'. Agnaye, produced by Shri AV Anoop of AVA Productions, captures every aspect of an Athirathram or Agni Yagam. The documentary Akkitham is about the famous Malayalam poet Akkitham Achyuthan Namboothiri. He has also authored two short story collections, two non-fiction books, 26 important research paper, and numerous articles.

Education 
Dr. G. Prabha holds a Doctorate in Sanskrit, conferred by the University of Madras in the year 2001.

Movie 
Ishti (English: Search for the Self), is a Sanskrit film, directed by Dr. G. Prabha features thespian Nedumudi Venu and newcomer Athira Patel in key roles. "Ishti" literally means search for self, yaga, etc. The film is the first in Sanskrit with a social theme.

Ishti, is written, scripted, produced and directed by Dr. Prabha Gopala Pillai, a Sanskrit professor and a doctorate holder in Sanskrit. Ishti is not the country's first Sanskrit film. But it certainly is the first one to deal with a social theme.

Dr. Prabha is presently directing his second Sanskrit movie 'Taya'. Taya starring Nedumnudi Venu and Anumol

Awards and honors 
 First Directorial Feature Film Ishti became the Opening film, of the Indian Panorama in the feature film section of the IFFI Goa 2016
 1st Best Documentary Film 2014 award for the documentary Agnaye by National Academy of Cinema and Television, Bangalore (2014)
 Dr. T.N. Anathakrishnan Research award for the year 1998-1999
 Dr. T.N. Anathakrishnan Research award for the year 2012-2013 (Second Time)
 Best Director award for the documentary film Akkitham by Kerala Audience Council, Thrissur (2010)
 Best Director award for the documentary film Akkitham by Dakshina Film Festival, Chennai (2011)
 Special Jury award for Best documentary Akkitham by Dakshina Film Festival, Chennai (2011)

References

Links
 The Hindu Friday Review - Dr. G. Prabha at the sets of his directorial debut Ishti
 Dr. G. Prabha captures a documentary film on Akkitham
 Ishti (film)
 Dr. G Prabha and Ishti
 Shevlin Sebastian
 Rites and wrongs
 Fight against patriarchy
 G. Prabha’s Sanskrit film Ishti pits the feminine spirit against patriarchy. http://www.frontline.in/arts-and-culture/cinema/fight-against-patriarchy/article9103842.ece …pic.twitter.com/KuEFn1s4ck
 IFFI 2016: Sanskrit Film Ishti to Open Indian Panorama Section
 Sanskrit Film ‘Ishti’ to Open Indian Panorama Section of IFFI 2016
 A cultural trip in search of Vedic rituals | Chennai News - Times of India || Agnaye
 Know Thyself
 
 Visual poetry
 കേരളത്തിനു വേണ്ട, ഗോവയിൽ ‘ഇഷ്ടി’ക്ക് കൈയടികളോടെ സ്വീകരണം
 Spotlight on orthodoxy
 Sanskrit film 'Ishti' opens Indian Panorama at IFFI | Video

Living people
Indian schoolteachers
Indian Sanskrit scholars
Year of birth missing (living people)